The Street House is a historic cottage in Point Clear, Alabama, U.S.. It was built in 1906 for William Street. The house has remained in the family; by the 1980s, it belonged to H. Vaughn Street III. It has been listed on the National Register of Historic Places since December 20, 1988.

References

Houses on the National Register of Historic Places in Alabama
Houses completed in 1906
Houses in Baldwin County, Alabama
1906 establishments in Alabama